Caio Danilo Laursen Tuponi, simply known as Caio Mancha (born 22 September 1992), is a Brazilian footballer who plays as a forward for Portuguesa.

Honours 
Palmeiras
Campeonato Brasileiro Série B: 2013

Portuguesa
Campeonato Paulista Série A2: 2022

References

External links

Caio Mancha at ZeroZero

1992 births
Living people
Brazilian footballers
Association football forwards
Campeonato Brasileiro Série A players
Campeonato Brasileiro Série B players
Campeonato Brasileiro Série C players
Sociedade Esportiva Palmeiras players
Associação Portuguesa de Desportos players
Guarani FC players
Rio Claro Futebol Clube players
ABC Futebol Clube players
Associação Ferroviária de Esportes players
Esporte Clube Taubaté players
Clube Atlético Votuporanguense players
Esporte Clube XV de Novembro (Piracicaba) players
Esporte Clube Pelotas players